Lourdes Leon Guerrero may refer to:

Lourdes A. Leon Guerrero, Guam nurse, politician, and business leader
Lourdes Santiago Torres Leon Guerrero, Guam educator